Florian Krüger (born 13 February 1999) is a German professional footballer who plays as a centre-forward for Eredivisie club Groningen.

Career

Erzgebirge Aue
Born in Staßfurt, Krüger made his professional debut for Erzgebirge Aue in the 2. Bundesliga on 24 November 2018, starting in the away match against VfL Bochum. He assisted Pascal Testroet in the 2nd minute for Aue's opening goal, with the match finishing as a 2–1 loss. On 5 November 2020, his contract was extended until 30 June 2023.

Arminia Bielefeld
On 23 June 2021, Krüger signed for Bundesliga side Arminia Bielefeld on a four-year contract for a fee of €1 million.

Groningen
On 30 August 2022, Krüger signed a four-year contract with Groningen in the Netherlands.

Career statistics

References

External links

1999 births
Living people
People from Staßfurt
German footballers
Footballers from Saxony-Anhalt
Association football forwards
Germany youth international footballers
Germany under-21 international footballers
Bundesliga players
2. Bundesliga players
FC Erzgebirge Aue players
Arminia Bielefeld players
FC Groningen players
German expatriate footballers
German expatriate sportspeople in the Netherlands
Expatriate footballers in the Netherlands